The Plan is a 2015 Indian Kannada suspense thriller film written and directed by Keerthi in his debut, and produced by Ashok Shetty. The cast includes Ananth Nag, Kousthubh Jayakumar, Hemanth, Sriram, Jagadish, Sanath, Gauthami, Harish Roy, and Ramesh Bhat. The film's background score is done by Surender Sodhi.

Plot 
Three youngsters are sent to Madikeri District Prison for their crime by district court for a crime. The prisoners explore the option of escape from the prison with detail plan. How they succeed and deal with strict jailer?

Cast
Ananth Nag
Ramesh Bhat
Gowthami Gowda
Promod Shetty
Kousthubh Jayakumar
Hemanth
Sriram
Jagadish
Harish Roy

Soundtrack
The soundtrack consists of 1 song composed by Richard for which the lyrics is written by Ranjith B. L.

 "Hogide Jaari" - Shaan

References

External links
 

2015 films
Indian thriller drama films
2010s Kannada-language films
2015 thriller drama films